Gianfranco Sanguinetti (born 16 July 1948, Pully, Switzerland) is a writer who was a member of the Situationist International (SI), a political art movement. He is Teresa Mattei's son.

Biography 
Sanguinetti was deported from France in 1971 and settled in Italy.

By 1972, Sanguinetti and Guy Debord were the only two remaining members of the SI. Together they wrote "The Veritable Split In The International" a book detailing the rise and fall of the SI.

Again working with Debord, in August 1975, Sanguinetti wrote a pamphlet titled  (Eng: The Real Report on the Last Chance to Save Capitalism in Italy), which (inspired by Niccolò Machiavelli and Bruno Bauer) purported to be the cynical writing of "Censor", a powerful industrialist. The pamphlet was to show how the ruling class of Italy supported the  Piazza Fontana bombing and other covert, false flag mass slaughter, for the higher goal of defending the capitalist status quo from the communist claims. The pamphlet was mailed to 520 of Italy's most powerful individuals. It was received as genuine, and powerful politicians, industrialists and journalist praised its content and guessed on the identity of its high-profile author. After reprinting the tract into a small book, Sanguinetti revealed himself to be the true author. Scandal raised after the revelation, and under pressure from Italian authorities, Sanguinetti left Italy in February 1976, and was denied entry to France.

Published works 
 The Real Report on the Last Chance to Save Capitalism in Italy (1975)
 On Terrorism and the State (1979)
 Remedy to Everything (1980)

Notes and references

Sources 
 Éditions Champ Libre, Correspondance, volume 2, éditions Champ Libre, 1981
 Guy Debord, Correspondance, volumes 4 et 5, Fayard
 Christophe Bourseiller, Histoire générale de l'ultra-gauche, Denoël,

External links 

 Gianfranco Sanguinetti: Texts in translation by Not Bored!
  Brief story of the Italian section of the International situationist by Miguel Amorós
 Gianfranco Sanguinetti Papers. General Collection, Beinecke Rare Book and Manuscript Library, Yale University.
 

1948 births
Living people
20th-century Swiss philosophers
Continental philosophers
Situationists
Social philosophy